The city of Tabriz in the Persian region of Azerbaijan changed hands several times during World War I (1914–1918) between forces of the Ottoman Empire and the Russian Empire.

At the start of the war Tabriz was already held by Russian forces and had been since the Russian occupation of 1911. On 31 June 1914, three days after the war began, the Iranian government declared neutrality. Despite this, once the Russians started their campaign in autumn, they sent additional forces to northwestern Iran, reinforcing the 10,000 men already there with an additional 60,000.

On 2 January 1915, at the Battle of Sarikamish in the Caucasus, Ottoman forces started their campaign inside Iran and forced Russian forces to retreat to Jolfa. During this campaign, Ottoman forces occupied Tabriz.

With fresh forces, the Russians defeated Ottoman forces south of Jolfa and regained control of Tabriz in early February 1915. The Russians proceeded on toward the west, invaded Urmia and went up to Van Lake. At the same time the Russians entered central Iran and occupied Qazvin, Karaj, and Tehran.

After the February Revolution in 1917, front-line Russian forces dissolved and started to retreat from Iran. Ottoman forces quickly took action and occupied northwestern Iran and Tabriz. They stayed in Tabriz until 23 August 1918, despite two British efforts to dislodge them.

See also
 Persian Campaign

References

1910s in Iran
History of Tabriz
Battles of World War I involving the Ottoman Empire
Battles of World War I involving Russia
Middle Eastern theatre of World War I